Crackerjack is a 2002 Australian comedy film starring Mick Molloy, Bill Hunter, Frank Wilson, Monica Maughan, Samuel Johnson, Lois Ramsay, Bob Hornery, Judith Lucy, John Clarke and Denis Moore.

Plot
Jack Simpson is a wisecracking, directionless layabout who works at an inner city telemarketing firm. For years he has been a member at the Cityside Lawn Bowls Club (in fact he has three memberships), but he has never played a single game, having only joined to get the free parking spaces from which he makes extra cash by renting them to his workmates. But Cityside is in dire financial trouble and a greedy developer, Bernie Fowler, wants to turn it into a soulless pokies venue. The Club President, Len, decides that all existing members must now play and Jack reluctantly has to turn up on Saturdays to take part in the bowling matches. Jack proves to be a natural player but he soon annoys and upsets the older club members with his brashness and lack of tact. Veteran player Stan, sensing that Jack only needs some guidance, both in the game and in life, takes him under his wing, trying to teach him to think of other people apart from himself.

After losing his girlfriend and his job, the Bowls Club suddenly becomes all Jack has in his life and, despite himself, he grows fond of the older members. His flatmate, Dave, joins the club and he starts a relationship with Nancy, a journalist. Bernie, determined to take over the club, investigates Jack and exposes his illegal car park hiring scam, which almost gets him expelled. Cityside enters a major tournament at Bernie's glitzy club, the prize money from which will save their independence. Jack's selfish showboating almost costs them the first round but Stan and the others make Jack finally realise he is part of a team.

Police arrive to arrest Len as (in a tip-off from Bernie) they discovered marijuana stored at the club. The greenkeeper has been secretly growing it but Jack is blamed by the other members. Dave and two of the ladies, Gwen and Eileen, approach the State Governor and convince her to overturn a lifetime ban on Cliff Carew, the club's best player, and the latter takes Len's place. Cityside fights their way into the lead and Stan throws the winning shot but he suffers a severe heart attack as he does so and Bernie lodges a protest, meaning the shot is disallowed. Jack insists that the rules allow the team a re-shot and he takes his special shot, the 'Flipper', which wins the tournament. To rub salt into the wounds, Nancy proves that whilst spying on the club, Bernie violated a restraining order banning him from the club, an illegal act which disqualifies Bernie from holding a gaming licence.

Cityside experiences both triumph and tragedy; the club is saved and can continue in its old form. However, Stan passes away and the club names the green in his honour. The pot growing greenkeeper is sacked and Jack takes over his job and is comforted by Len who says Stan loved him like a son, he and Nancy begin a new life with their friends at the club. The film's end credits feature a postscript with still images and a narration by Jack describing the later exploits of all the characters.

Cast
Jack Simpson –  Mick Molloy
Stan Coombs –  Bill Hunter
Dave Jackson –  Samuel Johnson
Nancy Brown –  Judith Lucy
Bernie Fowler –  John Clarke
Len Johnson –  Frank Wilson
Eileen –  Monica Maughan
Gwen –  Lois Ramsey
Norm –  Cliff Ellen
Ron –  Bob Hornery
Cliff Carew –  John Flaus
Edgar –  Peter Aanensen
Mrs Jenkins –  Esme Melville
Mandy –  Robyn Butler
Greenkeeper –  Brett Swain
Supervisor –  Christopher Kirby
Official –  Denis Moore
Governor –  Joan Murray
Announcer –  Tony Martin
Security Guard –  Steve Hutchinson

Reception
Paul Byrnes, writing in the Sydney Morning Herald, referred to Crackerjack as 'a good-natured comedy...in which there's a nostalgia for our lost honour...This nostalgia for an Australia of mateship and communal spirit is the film's main surprise. This is a broad comedy with a televisual style – including some dreadful mugging to camera – so who expected social critique as well? The movie is about Jack getting knocked off the donkey, like St Paul. Jack grows to manhood through bowls. This field of green becomes his Gallipoli, in a way, as a bunch of senior citizens teach him about honour, fidelity, and teamwork.'

Megan Spencer, reviewing the film for Triple J, gave the film a positive review. 'Yes, Crackerjack is a familiar journeyman story, but it is one that rings true with some generously observed comedy and pathos, a film that unlike its Aussie cousins The Dish, Welcome To Woop Woop, The Castle, Siam Sunset etc. etc.... it doesn't patronise its characters, nor over-exploit the 'middle Australia' culture in which it is set.'

David Stratton, writing in Variety, was less enthusatic, referring to Crackerjack as 'a middling comedy which fails to live up to its explosive title....A pleasant enough screen personality, Molloy is, however, barely able to carry such a modest project... Stronger support comes from a fine ensemble of vets, especially saucy octogenarian Esme Melville; and John Flaus as the club's most enigmatic member.'

When Crackerjack was first screened on free-to-air television, Network Ten ran station promotions over the film's end credits, obscuring most of the postscript narration by the character Jack. Mick Molloy was interviewed by ABC TV's Media Watch where he voiced his annoyance.

Filming
The main location for bowls scenes, including the greens, carpark, and interior rooms, were filmed at the Melbourne Bowling Club in Windsor, Victoria.
Location shots of other bowls clubs included filming at the Carrum Bowling Club in the Melbourne suburb of Carrum. The Corowa Bowls Club in the NSW town of Corowa was also used for scenes featured in the finale.

Box office
Crackerjack grossed $8,618,107 at the box office in Australia.

Crackerjack was the highest-grossing Australian film of the year and received two AFI Award nominations, for direction (Paul Moloney) and the screenplay (by Mick and brother Richard Molloy).
Crackerjack won a GOLD Award for Cinematography at the 2002 Victorian & Tasmanian awards for Director of Photography Brent Crockett ACS

See also
Cinema of Australia

References

External links 
 
 
 Crackerjack at the National Film and Sound Archive

2002 films
Bowls films
2000s English-language films
Films shot in Melbourne
2000s buddy comedy films
2000s sports comedy films
Australian buddy comedy films
Australian sports comedy films
Bowls in Australia
Films set in New South Wales
Films set in Victoria (Australia)
2002 directorial debut films
2002 comedy films
Roadshow Entertainment films
Films directed by Paul Moloney